Apollophanes of Athens was a poet of the old Attic comedy. He appears to have been a contemporary of Strattis, and to have consequently lived about Olympiad 95.

Surviving titles and fragments
The editors of the Suda ascribe to him five comedies, viz. Δάλις, Ἰφιγέρων, Κρῆτες, Δανάη and Κένταυροι. Of the former three we still possess a few fragments, but the last two are completely lost.

Notes

 

Ancient Athenian dramatists and playwrights
5th-century BC Athenians
Old Comic poets